Live from the Royal Albert Hall is a live album and video release by American rock band the Killers, released on November 9, 2009, by Island Records. The album is pulled from two nights the band performed at the Royal Albert Hall in July 2009, and also includes footage from festival dates the band headlined during the middle months of 2009. A CD of live material accompanies the DVD as part of the package.
The artwork resembles the artwork for the band's third studio album, Day & Age, and was designed by artist Paul Normansell.

Brandon Flowers said the decision to film the band's first live DVD at the Royal Albert Hall was because "London’s always been very good to us. They opened their arms to us before anybody else did. And Royal Albert Hall is a very iconic and special place. I grew up watching Morrissey videos that he had filmed there. So it was really exciting to be a part of it."

Live from the Royal Albert Hall was nominated for Best DVD at the 2010 NME Awards.

Reception

Critical

Critical response to Live from the Royal Albert Hall was positive. Eric Stromsvold of Starpulse said the release was "quite possibly the best live album and video since Elvis and his 'Aloha From Hawaii' some 36 years ago. It's nothing less than rock and roll at its greatest." Barry Walters of Rolling Stone wrote that "Brandon Flowers doesn't sing: he testifies." Entertainment Weekly included the DVD on its "Must List", remarking, "When Brandon Flowers et al. explode into closing number 'When You Were Young,' and the fans start to sing (and then jump) along, it's a wonder those 138-year-old walls stay standing."

Commercial
Live from the Royal Albert Hall was the fourth best-selling music DVD of 2009 in the United Kingdom, selling 83,965 copies in the seven weeks following its release.

Track listing

 The DVD also includes behind-the-scenes footage, including interviews with crew and fans.
 Although it was not announced by the band, they also released a Blu-ray version of the concert, although this does not include the live CD.

Limited edition formats
The Killers announced that they would be offering exclusive limited-edition packages for the album.
Collector's Package
The album in DVD/CD or Blu-ray
Poster promoting the original concerts
Poster of the band and cover art
12" picture discs of "Human" and "Spaceman"
7" white vinyl of "Human"
LP version of Day & Age
iPod friendly "When You Were Young" video
Fan Package
The album in DVD/CD or Blu-ray
Poster promoting the original concerts
iPod friendly "When You Were Young" video

Personnel

The Killers
Brandon Flowers: lead vocals, keyboards except on "For Reasons Unknown", bass on "For Reasons Unknown"
Dave Keuning: lead guitar and backing vocals
Mark Stoermer: bass except on "For Reasons Unknown", rhythm guitar on "For Reasons Unknown", backing vocals
Ronnie Vannucci Jr.: drums, percussion

Support members
Ray Suen: keyboards, rhythm guitar, violin and backing vocals
Rob Whited: percussion and backing vocals
Bobby Lee Parker: acoustic guitar
Tommy Marth: saxophone and backing vocals

Charts

Weekly charts

Year-end charts

Certifications

Release history

References

2009 live albums
2009 video albums
Island Records live albums
Island Records video albums
The Killers live albums
The Killers video albums
Live albums recorded at the Royal Albert Hall
Live video albums